Aithal is the lastname or surname of some persons belonging to Kota or Shivalli Brahmin the subsect of Brahmin in Dakshina Kannada and Udupi districts of Karnataka, India. In general, Aithals residing in these districts speak a regional dialect of the Kannada and Tulu language. There are many Aithals who have migrated to other places within erstwhile South Canara district e.g., Surathkal or Puttur and claim those places as their native places.  People with the surname Aithal have emigrated from India to Europe and North America beginning in the early to mid-1960s, with many having permanently settled outside of India.

Etymology
The word Aithal  derives from a prerequisite vedic ritual of securing and maintaining the three fires.  Ahita anala yasya sah, is an ahitanala, which essentially means one who has secured and has been maintaining the three fires required for an agnichayanam.  The Apabhramsa form of this word became aithala.  As one of the members of a vedic group, Aithalas have co-existed with Vaishnavas for a long time. Aithal comes from the Sanskrit words ahiti which means placing and anala meaning fire. The meaning is similar to the word agnihotra.

Indian surnames
Tulu Brahmins
Kannada Brahmins
Karnataka society
Surnames of Indian origin
Hindu surnames